A marsiya is an elegiac poem written to commemorate the martyrdom and valour of Hussain ibn Ali and his comrades of the Karbala. Marsiyas are essentially religious.

Background
The word Marsiya is derived from the Arabic word marthiyya (root R-TH-Y), meaning a great tragedy or lamentation for a departed soul.  Marsiya is a poem written to commemorate the martyrdom of Ahl al-Bayt, Imam Hussain and Battle of Karbala. It is usually a poem of mourning.

Marsiyas in Urdu first appeared in the sixteenth century in the Deccan kingdoms of India. They were written either in the two-line unit form, qasida, or the four-line unit form, murabba. Over time, the musaddas became the most suitable form for a marsiya. In this form, the first four lines of each stanza referred to as the band have one rhyme scheme while the remaining two line referred to as the tip have another.

This form found a specially congenial soil in Lucknow, an important Shia Muslim community in the Indian subcontinent, where it was regarded as an act of piety and religious duty to eulogize and bemoan the martyrs of the battle of Karbala. The genre was championed by Mir Babar Ali Anis.

Famous marsiya writers in Urdu include Mir Babar Ali Anis, Mirza Salamat Ali Dabeer, Ali Haider Tabatabai, Najm Afandi, Josh Malihabadi, and others. Well-known Persian poets of the genre include Muhtasham Kashani, Nawab Ahmad Ali Khan Qayamat and Samet Borujerdi.  In Turkish, Bâkî composed an important marsiya.

Mir Babar Ali Anis, a renowned Urdu poet, composed salāms, elegies, nohas and quatrains. While the length of elegy initially had no more than forty or fifty stanzas, he pushed it beyond one hundred fifty or even longer than two hundred stanzas or bands, as each unit of marsiya in the musaddas format is known. Mir Anis drew upon the vocabulary of Arabic, Persian, Urdu, Hindi, and Awadhi to a great degree. He has become an essential element of Muharram among the Urdu-speakers of the Indian subcontinent. The first major and still current critical articulation about Mir Anis was Muazna-e-Anis-o-Dabir (1907) written by Shibli Nomani in which he said "the poetic qualities and merits of Anis are not matched by any other poet".

Chhannu Lal Dilgeer (c 1780 – c 1848), another marsiya poet, was born during the reign of Nawab Asaf-ud-Daulah. He was initially a ghazal poet with the takhallus ‘Tarab’, before focusing on marsiya at a later stage. He converted to Islam and changed his name to Ghulam Hussain. His most popular marsiya is called گھبراۓ گی زینبؑ ‘ گھبراۓ گی زینبؑ.

See also
 List of Marsiya writers in Urdu
 Shahr Ashob
 Urdu literature
 Urdu poetry
 Rekhta
 History of Urdu
 Waheed Akhtar

References

Cited sources

External links
 
 
 
 
 
 
Marsiya of Imam Hasan Hussain

Urdu-language poetry
Shia literature
Islamic poetry
Cultural depictions of Husayn ibn Ali
Islamic terminology
Laments
Persian literature